Vanik Zakaryan or Zakharyan (born 21 March 1936 in Meghri, Armenia) is an Armenian academic, specialist on complex analysis, Member of the Presidium of the Armenian Academy of Sciences (2000), Vice-president (1996) and the honorary vice-president (2000) of the World Chess Federation. He was awarded the Khorenatsi medal be decree of Robert Kocharyan in the first years of the third millennium.

He was graduated from the Yerevan State University, then worked as vice-rector for educational affairs of Yerevan State Pedagogical University. A Doctor of Physico-mathematical sciences (1992), professor, Zakaryan is the head of the Department of Mathematics of Yerevan Polytechnic since 1975.

He was twice Armenian chess champion (1961 jointly, and 1976 jointly).

References

External links
Zakaryan at sci.am

1936 births
Living people
People from Meghri
Armenian scientists
Armenian chess players
Yerevan State University alumni
Chess officials
Armenian sports executives and administrators